Wigthorpe is a hamlet in the civil parish of Carlton in Lindrick, in the Bassetlaw district lying to the north of Worksop, England.

References 

Hamlets in Nottinghamshire
Bassetlaw District